Iotyrris cingulifera is a species of sea snail, a marine gastropod mollusk in the family Turridae, the turrids.

Description
The length of the fusiform shell is 53 mm and its diameter 16 mm. The shell is rather narrow with a very long spire and short siphonal canal. It is corded with larger and smaller riblets and raised lines. The shell is very slightly angulated on each whorl by a somewhat larger rib, which is occasionally bipartite. The growth striae are sharp, sometimes decussating the smaller spiral lines. The color of the shell is whitish, very closely and finely peppered with chestnut and with chestnut spots on the shoulder rib.

Distribution
This marine species occurs in the Aldabra, Madagascar, Mozambique, Mascarene Basin, Mauritius, the Red Sea and Tanzania

References

 Dautzenberg, Ph. (1929). Mollusques testaces marins de Madagascar. Faune des Colonies Francaises, Tome III
 J. & M. Jay (1988). Coquillages de La Réunion et de l'île Maurice
 Michel, C. (1988). Marine molluscs of Mauritius. Editions de l'Ocean Indien. Stanley, Rose Hill. Mauritius

External links
 Lamarck, [J.-B. M. de. (1822). Histoire naturelle des animaux sans vertèbres. Tome septième. Paris: published by the Author, 711 pp]
 Iredale, T. (1931). Australian molluscan notes. Nº I. Records of the Australian Museum. 18: 201–235
 Kantor, Y.I.; Puillandre, N.; Olivera, B.M.; Bouchet, P. (2008). Morphological proxies for taxonomic decision in turrids (Mollusca, Neogastropoda): a test of the value of shell and radula characters using molecular data. Zoological Science, 25(11): 1156–1170
 Abdelkrim, J.; Aznar-Cormano, L.; Buge, B.; Fedosov, A.; Kantor, Y.; Zaharias, P.; Puillandre, N. (2018). Delimiting species of marine gastropods (Turridae, Conoidea) using RAD sequencing in an integrative taxonomy framework. Molecular Ecology. 27(22): 4591–4611.

cingulifera
Gastropods described in 1822